Tim Kelly (born August 17, 1986) is an American football coach who is the offensive coordinator for the Tennessee Titans of the National Football League (NFL). Previously, he coached with the Houston Texans in various assistant roles, including offensive coordinator, between 2014 and 2021. Kelly has also served as an assistant coach for several college football teams. He attended Eastern Illinois University, where he also played for their football team.

Coaching career

Penn State
In 2012 and 2013, Kelly worked as a graduate assistant for Penn State.

Houston Texans
Starting in 2014, Kelly spent three years as offensive quality control coach for head coach Bill O'Brien and the Houston Texans. He served as the tight ends coach in 2017 and 2018. On February 5, 2019, Kelly was promoted to offensive coordinator. In 2020, Kelly was given an additional role as quarterbacks coach.

On March 10, 2021, Kelly was retained as offensive coordinator under head coach David Culley. 

On January 13, 2022, Kelly was fired by the Texans, alongside head coach David Culley.

Tennessee Titans
On February 8, 2022, Kelly was hired by the Tennessee Titans as their passing game coordinator under head coach Mike Vrabel.

On February 7, 2023, Kelly was elevated to offensive coordinator.

Personal life
Kelly's brother, Dennis, played offensive tackle at Purdue before being drafted by the Philadelphia Eagles in the fifth round of the 2012 NFL Draft.

References

External links
 Tennessee Titans profile
 Eastern Illinois Panthers profile

Living people
1986 births
American football defensive tackles
Eastern Illinois Panthers football players
Houston Texans coaches
National Football League offensive coordinators
Players of American football from Illinois
Penn State Nittany Lions football coaches
Tennessee Titans coaches